Yukari Tachibana (橘 ゆかり Tachibana Yukari; born 8 October 1965 in Tokyo, Japan) is a Japanese actress.

References

External links

1965 births
Living people
Actresses from Tokyo